is a Japanese manga written and illustrated by Reiko Shimizu. It was serialized in Hakusensha's magazine, LaLa. It is licensed in North America by CMX Manga. The manga has been adapted into a theatrical interpretation of itself by Studio Life.

The story involves a prophecy about the offspring of an alien and a human, who might either save or destroy the world. The manga plays with issues of gender and mystery. It falls into the genres of both shōjo and science fiction.

Manga
Moon Child is written and illustrated by Reiko Shimizu. Hakusensha released the manga's 13 bound volumes between February 1989 and April 1993. CMX Manga released the manga's 13 tankōbon volumes in English between December 1, 2005, and June 9, 2009.

References

External links

1989 manga
CMX (comics) titles
Extraterrestrials in anime and manga
Hakusensha manga
Shōjo manga